Arhopala hypomuta is a species of butterfly belonging to the lycaenid family described by  William Chapman Hewitson in 1862 . It is found in  Southeast Asia (Thailand, Malay Peninsula, Sumatra)

Subspecies
Arhopala hypomuta hypomuta (Thailand, Malay Peninsula, Sumatra)
Arhopala hypomuta deva Bethune-Baker, 1896 (Borneo)

References

External links
"Arhopala Boisduval, 1832" at Markku Savela's Lepidoptera and Some Other Life Forms

Arhopala
Butterflies described in 1862
Taxa named by William Chapman Hewitson
Butterflies of Asia